9th SDFCS Awards 
December 21, 2004

Best Film: 
 Vera Drake 
The 9th San Diego Film Critics Society Awards, given by the San Diego Film Critics Society, honored the best in film for 2004.

Winners
Best Actor: 
Jim Carrey - Eternal Sunshine of the Spotless Mind
Best Actress: 
Imelda Staunton - Vera Drake
Best Animated Film: 
The Incredibles
Best Cinematography (tie): 
Hero (Ying xiong)
The Phantom of the Opera
Best Director: 
Clint Eastwood - Million Dollar Baby
Best Documentary Film: 
Tarnation
Best Editing: 
Eternal Sunshine of the Spotless Mind
Best Film: 
Vera Drake
Best Foreign Language Film:
The Sea Inside (Mar adentro) • Spain/France/Italy
Best Production Design: 
The Aviator
Best Score: 
"Million Dollar Baby" - Clint Eastwood
Best Screenplay - Adapted: 
Sideways - Alexander Payne and Jim Taylor
Best Screenplay - Original: 
Vera Drake - Mike Leigh
Best Supporting Actor: 
Phil Davis - Vera Drake
Best Supporting Actress: 
Natalie Portman - Closer
Body of Work award: 
Don Cheadle - The Assassination of Richard Nixon, Hotel Rwanda and The United States of Leland

2
2004 film awards
2004 in American cinema